Kurt Vonnegut: Unstuck in Time is a 2021 American documentary film, directed by Robert B. Weide.

Synopsis 
The film tells the story of Kurt Vonnegut's life and work. At the same time, it explores the process of making this film, which started 40 years earlier.

Cast 
The cast includes Jerome Klinkowitz, Sidney Offit, Morley Safer, Daniel Simon, and David L. Ulin.

Release and reception 
The film premiered at the 2021 DOC NYC film festival. In a review in The Hollywood Reporter, Angie Han wrote, "does, in the end, feel like a true act of friendship. If that isn’t nice, what is?" IndieWire's review, commented that the film "is at its best during the occasional stretches in which it candidly unpacks its own creation."

References

External links 

 
 

2021 films
2021 documentary films
American documentary films
American films based on actual events
Documentary films about writers
Kurt Vonnegut
2020s English-language films
2020s American films
Films shot in Indiana